RNLB Spirit of Lowestoft (ON 1132) is a Tyne-class lifeboat which was stationed at Lowestoft in the English county of Suffolk. The lifeboat began its service at the station in 1987 and was replaced by a Shannon class boat in 2014.

Notable rescues and awards

On 29 August 1996, Spirit of Lowestoft was launched, along with the Aldeburgh Lifeboat Freddie Cooper (ON 1193) to assist the yacht Red House Lugger which had sent out a mayday signal during a storm. On arrival, the lifeboats found that the P&O cargo ferry  was sheltering the yacht. The lifeboats evacuated the yacht's crew, and the Lugger was towed to Harwich, with the rescue taking around 12 hours in total. On 27 November 1996, coxswain of the Spirit of Lowestoft, John Cathpole received the RNLI bronze medal for his part in the rescue.

Museum exhibit
Since 2019, Spirit of Lowestoft has been one of the lifeboats exhibited at the Chatham Historic Dockyard.

References

 

Lifeboats of Suffolk
1987 ships
Tyne-class lifeboats